The Miss District of Columbia's Outstanding Teen competition is the pageant that selects a representative from District of Columbia for the Miss America's Outstanding Teen pageant.

Lauren Williams of Washington, D.C. was crowned Miss District of Columbia's Outstanding Teen on June 19, 2022 at the Katzen Arts Center of American University in Washington, D.C. She competed for the title of Miss America's Outstanding Teen 2023 at the Hyatt Regency Dallas in Dallas, Texas on August 12, 2022 where she was named 1st runner-up.

Results summary 
The following is a visual summary of the results present in table seen below. The year in parentheses indicates year of Miss America's Outstanding Teen competition the award/placement was garnered.

Placements 
 1st runner-up: Lauren Williams (2023)
 Top 10: Jasmine Alexis (2009)

Awards

Preliminary awards 
 Preliminary Evening Wear/On-Stage Question: Hope Wiseman (2010)

Non-finalist awards 
 Non-finalist Evening Wear/On-Stage Question: Hope Wiseman (2010)
 Non-finalist Interview: Hope Wiseman (2010)

Winners

References

District of Columbia
Culture of Washington, D.C.
Women in Washington, D.C.
Annual events in Washington, D.C.